Pascale Ducongé (born 6 January 1961) is a French former swimmer. She competed in the women's 4 × 100 metre medley relay at the 1976 Summer Olympics.

References

External links
 

1961 births
Living people
French female swimmers
Olympic swimmers of France
Swimmers at the 1976 Summer Olympics
Place of birth missing (living people)